Noah Henchoz (born 22 February 2002) is a Swiss professional footballer who plays as a defender for Étoile Carouge on loan from Servette.

Career statistics

Club

Notes

References

2002 births
Living people
Sportspeople from the canton of Geneva
Swiss men's footballers
Switzerland youth international footballers
Association football defenders
Étoile Carouge FC players
Servette FC players
Swiss Super League players
2. Liga Interregional players
Swiss Promotion League players